The following is a timeline of the history of the city of Cambridge, England.

Prior to 16th century
 973 – Market active
 c.1000–50 – St Bene't's Church built
 1068 – Cambridge Castle erected
 1101 – Town incorporated
 c.1130 – Holy Sepulchre church built
 1144 – Cambridge is sacked by Geoffrey de Mandeville
 1154 – Cambridge fair active
 1200 – Charter granted
 1209 – University of Cambridge established by scholars from Oxford
 1211 – Stourbridge fair first recorded
 1213 – Hervey FitzEustace, 1st recorded mayor
 1261 – Cambridge academics attempt to set up a university of Northampton, suppressed by the Crown in 1265
 1266 – Raided by Barons who had been disinherited after the Battle of Evesham, and the murder of the Jews in the town
 1275 – Expulsion of the town's Jews by Queen Dowager Eleanor of Provence
 1284 – University's Peterhouse college founded
 1326 – Clare College founded
 1347 – Pembroke College founded
 1348 – Gonville & Caius College founded
 1350 – Trinity Hall college founded
 1352 – Corpus Christi College founded
 1381 – Disorder during the Peasants' Revolt
 1416 – University Library exists by this date
 1441 – King's College founded
 1446 – Foundation stone of King's College Chapel laid
 1448 – Queens' College founded
 1473 – St. Catherine College founded
 1496 – Jesus College founded

16th-18th centuries

 1505 – Christ's College founded
 1511 – St John's College established
 1515 – King's College Chapel fan vault completed
 1521 – John Siberch is active as a printer, the earliest known here
 1525 – Robert Barnes gives probably the first openly evangelical sermon in an English church, at St Edward King and Martyr
 1534 – University Press granted a royal charter
 1542 – Magdalene College founded
 1546 – Trinity College founded
 1556 – John Hullier burned as a Protestant on Jesus Green
 1584 – Emmanuel College founded
 1595 – Sidney Sussex College founded
 1615 – Perse School founded
 1638 – Cambridge, Massachusetts named
 1640 – Oliver Cromwell elected Member of Parliament for Cambridge
 1667 – Eagle and Child pub in business
 1695 – Wren Library at Trinity College completed
 1730 – University's Senate House completed
 1744 – Cambridge Journal and Weekly Flying Post begins publication
 1747 – Shire-hall built
 1749 – Mathematical Bridge built at Queens' College
 1762 – Cambridge Chronicle newspaper begins publication
 1766 – Addenbrooke's Hospital founded
 1784 – Society for Promoting Useful Knowledge established
 1793
 Cambridge Intelligencer newspaper begins publication
 Cambridge Quarters composed for new clock of the Church of St Mary the Great

19th century
 1800 – Downing College founded
 1816 – Fitzwilliam Museum founded
 1817 – Cambridge Town Club (cricket club) formed.
 1828
 Bull Hotel in business
 Cambridge University Boat Club founded
 1829 – The Boat Race, rowed against Oxford, begins (annual from 1856)
 1831 – Bridge of Sighs built over the Cam at St John's College
 1833 – The Pitt Building built in honour of William Pitt the Younger, an undergraduate of Pembroke College and Prime Minister, to house the printing and publishing offices of Cambridge University Press
 1833 – Anatomy theatre attacked by a mob
 1839 – Cambridge Advertiser newspaper begins publication
 1840 – Cambridge Antiquarian Society founded
 1841 – Cambridge's first post-reformation Roman Catholic church opens as St Andrew's Church
 1845 – Eastern Counties Railway begins operating to Cambridge railway station
 1848 – Mill Road Cemetery established
 1858 – Cambridge School of Art founded
 1854 – Deighton, Bell & Co. booksellers in business
 1869 – Girton College for women founded
 1871 – Newnham College for women founded
 1874 – Cavendish Laboratory completed
 1876 – W. Heffer bookseller begins business as a stationer
 1880
 Cambridge Street Tramways begin operation
 St Radegund pub built on part of the site of the Garrick Hotel
 1881 – Ridley Hall and Westcott House theological colleges founded
 1883 – Footlights student amateur dramatic club founded
 1884 – Museum of Archaeology and Anthropology founded
 1888 – Cambridge Daily News begins publication
 1890
 Our Lady and the English Martyrs Church consecrated
 Victoria Avenue Bridge built
 1894 – Homerton College, a Congregationalist teacher training college, moves to Cambridge
 1896 – Pye Ltd established as scientific instrument makers by W. G. Pye
 1897 – Diamond Jubilee of Queen Victoria
 1899 – Westminster College, a Presbyterian theological college, moves to Cambridge

20th century
 1901 – Population: 38,379
1908 – Cambridge Town F.C. formed
 1912
 Cambridge United F.C. established as Abbey United
 University's Sedgwick Museum of Earth Sciences opens
 1914 – Cambridge Street Tramways cease operation
 1918 – First Festival of Nine Lessons and Carols held at King's College
 c 1921 – Fitzbillies bakery opened by Ernest and Arthur Mason in Trumpington Street
 1922 – War Memorial unveiled
 1923 – Jesus Green Swimming Pool opens
 1928 – Cambridge Preservation Society founded
 1934 – New University Library completed
 1938 – Cambridge Airport opens
 1948 – First women admitted to study for full academic degrees in the University but have no associated privileges
 1949
 University's Cambridge Bibliographical Society founded
 University of Cambridge's Electronic Delay Storage Automatic Calculator begins operating
1951 – City charter granted
 1954 – Murray Edwards College for women founded as New Hall
 1956 – Kettle's Yard established by Jim Ede
 1957 – Twinned with Heidelberg
 1958 – Churchill College established
 1960 – Cambridge Consultants founded
 1964
 Darwin College for graduates founded
 Cambridge Folk Festival begins
 1965
 Lucy Cavendish College for mature women founded
 Wolfson College for mature students founded as University College
 1966
 Clare Hall for graduates established
 Fitzwilliam College chartered as a college
 1970
 February: Garden House riot
 Heffer's open a flagship bookshop in Trinity Street
 1972
 Three previously all-male colleges of the University admit women undergraduates
 Cambridge Theological Federation formed
1974
First Strawberry Fair held
First Cambridge Beer Festival held
 1975 – University's Cambridge Science Park founded
 1976
 Sancton Wood School founded
 First Andy's Records store opened in Mill Road
 1977 – Robinson College founded
 1989 – Cambridge Fun Run (footrace) begins
 1990
 Royal Greenwich Observatory relocated to Cambridge from Herstmonceux Castle
 ARM Holdings established as Advanced RISC Machines Ltd
 1992 – Anglia Ruskin University is established as a public university
 1998 – Abcam established

21st century
 2003 – University's Centre for Mathematical Sciences completed in West Cambridge
 2006
 Local Plan 2006 (town planning) adopted
 Cambridge International School established
 2007 – The Centre for Computing History is established
 2009 – Anne Jarvis becomes first woman University Librarian of the University of Cambridge
 2010 – Homerton College chartered as a full college of the University of Cambridge
 2011 – Phase One of the Cambridgeshire Guided Busway opens
 2013 – North West Cambridge development planned
 2016 – New global headquarters for AstraZeneca projected for completion
 2017 – Cambridge North railway station opens
 2019 – Sonita Alleyne becomes the first black woman elected as head of an Oxbridge college, Master of Jesus

See also
 History of Cambridge
 History of University of Cambridge
 History of Cambridgeshire

References

Further reading
 Cambridge by M.A.R. Tuker in multiple formats at gutenberg.org

Published in the 19th century

1800s-1840s 
 
 
 
 
 v.2
 v.3
 v.5, 1850-1856
  + v.2

1850s-1890s

Published in the 20th century 
1900s-1940s
 
 
 
 
 
 
 

1950s-1990s
 
 
 
 
 
 
 
 
Wilkinson, Patrick, (1981) Le Keux's Engravings of Victorian Cambridge (Cambridge: Cambridge University Press)

External links

 . Includes digitized directories of Cambridge, various dates
 Digital Public Library of America. Works related to Cambridge, various dates

cambridge
 
Cambridge-related lists
Cambridge